Zos Kia Cultus (Here and Beyond) is the sixth studio album by Polish extreme metal band Behemoth. It was recorded at the Hendrix Studios in June–September 2002 and mastered at the High End Studio in Warsaw in September 2002.

The title refers to Zos Kia Cultus, a form of magic developed by Austin Osman Spare. At the end of the track "Horns ov Baphomet", the person speaking is Aleister Crowley. It is from the track At Sea from the CD The Great Beast Speaks, which contains audio files from the only known recording of his voice. 

The album was re-released through Peaceville Records as a limited edition digipak. It contained an enhanced audio disc with a video of As Above So Below included with the release.

Track listing

Personnel

 Behemoth
 Adam "Nergal" Darski – lead, rhythm & acoustic guitars, vocals, mixing, lyrics
 Mateusz Maurycy "Havok" Śmierzchalski – lead and rhythm guitar
 Zbigniew Robert "Inferno" Promiński – drums and percussion

 Additional musicians
 Marcin "Novy" Nowak – bass guitar
 Jerzy "U.Reck" Głód (Lux Occulta) – synthesizers 
 Raven Moonshae – sound effects
 Piotr "Trozky" Weltrowski – sound effects

 Production
 Krzysztof Azarewicz – all mantras and spells, lyrics
 Sharon E. Wennekers – grammatical and poetical consultation
 Arkadiusz "Malta" Malczewski – sound engineering, mixing
 Maurycy Śmierzchalski – photography
 Tomasz "Graal" Daniłowicz – cover design and artwork
 Grzegorz Piwkowski – audio mastering

 Note
 Produced at Hendrix Studios, June–September 2002. 
 Mastered at High End Studio, Warsaw, September 2002.

Release history

References

2002 albums
Behemoth (band) albums
Avantgarde Music albums
Albums produced by Adam Darski